Simon Bucharoff (April 20, 1881, Berdychiv, Russian Empire – November 24, 1955) was an American pianist, composer and educator born in Berdychiv, Russian Empire. He graduated from the Vienna Conservatory. He died in Chicago.

Education
Vienna Conservatory of Music, 1902

Teachers
Piano: Julius Epstein and Emil Sauer, Vienna
Composition: Stephen Stocker and Robert Fuchs, Vienna

Career
Head of Piano Dept. of Wichita College of Music, 1907 
Piano concertist, 1906–16 
Lecturer on musical subjects; master classes piano and composition 1931–36. 
From 1937 music editor and arranger, Hollywood

Works

Musical works
Operas: A Lovers Knot, Sakahra, Jewel, Addio, Wastrel, (received David Bispham Medal for A Lovers Knot and Sakahra). 
Chorus and Orch.: Salute to a Free World; Freedom on the March; Hear My Voice, O Lord; Jerusalem. 
Orch.: Four Tone Poems; The Wanderers Song; The Trumpeters Death (Pf. & Orch.); America; Moses; Prelude; Valse Brillante; Das Sterbe Gloecklein (trans.), Capriccio (trans.). For baritone and orch.: Parable of Nothin and Somethin; O Ye Peoples and Nations; Rejoicing, 1 Laugh and Laugh and Laugh (Ballad). 
Also many compositions for piano, voice, violin and various combinations;

Books
The Modern Pianist's Text Book

Professional associations and awards
ASCAP, 1925
Bispham Memorial Medal Award ("A Lovers Knot" and "Sakahra")

References

External links

Ukrainian classical composers
American male composers
American composers
Ukrainian educators
20th-century American educators
Ukrainian pianists
People from Berdychiv
American pianists
1881 births
1955 deaths
Emigrants from the Russian Empire to the United States
American male pianists
20th-century American male musicians
20th-century American pianists